Paula Järv (1898 Harku Parish, Kreis Harrien – ?) was an Estonian politician. He was a member of I Riigikogu, representing the Estonian Independent Socialist Workers' Party. He was a member of the Riigikogu since 10 March 1922. He replaced Karl Ellis. On 25 April 1922, he resigned his position and he was replaced by Karl Tammik.

References

1898 births
Year of death missing
People from Harku Parish
People from Kreis Harrien
Estonian Independent Socialist Workers' Party politicians
Members of the Riigikogu, 1920–1923
Prisoners and detainees of Estonia
Estonian emigrants to the Soviet Union